The 1855 City of Toronto Municipal Election was the City's 21st municipal election. Polling occurred on the first Monday and Tuesday of the year, January 1st and 2nd. Elections for Aldermen and Councilmen were held in seven wards and for the Municipal License Inspector. Violence and intimidation over political control of St. John's Ward by candidates who represented the Orange Order marred the election.

Samuel Reid, the nephew of James Spence, a candidate for licence inspector, was fatally wounded on the second day of the election. Joseph Sheard, a reformist candidate for Alderman and Joseph Rowell, a councilman candidate, were also injured in attacks attributed to their opponent's supporters. Sheard and Rowell initially lost the election, but because of the violence, they disputed the results. Following a judicial review, the court found that Sheard won by four votes and forced a by-election for Councilmen, which Rowell won in March 1855.

After the election, George William Allan, the heir of one of Toronto's wealthiest men, banker William Allan, was appointed mayor by City Council.

Background

By the 1850s, the Orange Order was a powerful force in Toronto's municipal politics. The Order negotiated a middle ground between the traditional power blocks in local government, the Family Compact and Reform movement. The Orange Order aimed to ensure that its members benefited from patronage appointments.

St. John's Ward, Toronto's newest ward, was created in 1853 by the division of St. Patrick's Ward. The new ward was the poorest of the City's seven wards and a predominantly Irish protestant working-class neighbourhood and home to much of Toronto's small Black community. During the 1855 election, it was the site of a clash between incumbent reformers and ambitious Orangemen. The incumbents were Alderman Joseph Sheard, Councilmen Joseph Rowell and John Bugg, and Orangeman John Hillyard Cameron. The Orangemen Richard Dempsey and Robert (Bob) Moodie ran to oppose Sheard and Rowell. 

Outside St. John's Ward race was centred on tax rates and city expenditures. The City was embarking on large infrastructure projects to support the railways. In 1854, City Council awarded £150,000 to Gzowksi and Company to build the Esplanade, so that railways could enter and cross the City along the waterfront. The 1855 Council would revisit and rescind the contract.

The St. John's Ward Election and By-election  

On January 2, 1855, a crowd gathered around the polling place in St. John's Ward on the second voting day. They occupied the street, guarded the door, and only allowed voters to enter if they promised to vote for Dempsey and Moodie. In the afternoon, the crowd attacked Sheard and Rowell. In the attack, Sheard was thrown onto a pile of lumber and cut on the wrist by a knife. Rowell was injured when to trying to assist Sheard. When the dust settled, Dempsey won by four votes and Moodie by 42 votes. 

That same evening after the polls had closed, Samuel Reid was fatally stabbed. The fallout from the murder shook the ward. The police arrested eight people before the individual responsible was arrested after his name was discovered etched on the murder weapon. Reid could not vote but was active in the election through his membership in the Orange Order and the local fire hall. He was possibly a beneficiary of municipal patronage through his occupation as a Carter, which required a license. Ultimately the trial of the accused led to an acquittal on the grounds of self-defence.

Following the murder and violent attacks, Sheard and Rowell initiated legal proceedings to dispute the election results. The Court found that Dempsey had received eight votes from individuals who were not legally entitled to vote in St. John's Ward. As a result, Sheard was elected as the Alderman by a majority of 4 votes. The Court also ruled that "the freedom of the election was violated," ordering new elections for the place of Councilmen. On February 20, 1855, City Council unseated Dempsey and Moodie, administered Sheard's oath of office, and called for new elections to fill the vacancy for Councilmen.

Both Rowell and Moodie stood in the new election. Rowell was elected on March 1, 1855, by a majority of 10 votes. There was no repeat of the violence on election day, but at least one instance of intimidation by Mr. Moodie's supporters targeting the ward's Black residents in the week before the election. A group of Moodie's supporters interrupted a meeting of Black residents refusing to allow anyone to speak in support of Rowell.

Appointment of the Mayor 
City Council appointed the Mayor at the first meeting after the election on January 15, 1855, selecting candidates from a list of elected Alderman. Generally, the Council considered seniority and experience. The incumbent Mayor, Joshua George Beard, did not run for reelection in 1855 after experiencing a sever illness the previous winter. 

John Hillyard Cameron moved and John Smith seconded the resolution to elect George William Allan as Mayor. John Duggan had canvassed City Council before the meeting to secure the election but "had wisely withdrawn his name to prevent any unseemly contest." Following his unanimous election by the City Council Allan spoke to healing the Council's partisan differences, focusing on the infrastructure projects underway, and reducing taxes.

City Council Results

Each ward elected 2 Aldermen and 2 Councilmen. There were nine open seats in the 1855 election, and 19 members of the City Council stood for re-election. Two incumbents lost, Angus Morrison (elected to the Provincial assembly in the summer of 1854) and William Graham.

References 

1855
1855 in Ontario